Kanapeeksi is a village in Hiiumaa Parish, Hiiu County in northwestern Estonia.

The village is first mentioned in 1922 (Kanapuksi, or Kanapsi). Historically, the areas of village were part of Kõrgessaare Manor.

After 1940s the village was merged into Koidma, but in 1997 Kanapeeksi's village status was restored.

References
 

Villages in Hiiu County